John Renford Bambrough (29 April 1926 – 17 January 1999) was a British philosopher.  He was fellow of St John's College, Cambridge from 1950-1999, where he held the positions of Dean (1964–1979) and President (1979–1983).

Life
John Renford Bambrough was born in Silksworth, Sunderland, England on 29 April 1926. He was born into a mining background, his father having been an electrician at Silksworth Colliery. And he himself worked, as part of his national service, in a coalmine at Wearmouth Colliery from 1944 to 1945 as a Bevin Boy.

He died in Cambridge on 17 January 1999.

Works 
Books authored

 Reason, Truth and God (1969)
 Moral Skepticism and Moral Knowledge (1979)

Books edited

 The Philosophy of Aristotle (1963)
 New Essays on Plato and Aristotle (1965)
Plato, Popper and Politics: Some Contributions to a Modern Controversy (1967).
 Wisdom: Twelve Essays (1974)

Select papers/book chapters etc.

 'Universals and Family Resemblances', Proceedings of the Aristotelian Society, vol. 61 (1960–61), pp. 207–22.
 'A Proof of the Objectivity of Morals', American Journal of Jurisprudence, vol. 14 (1969), pp. 37–53.
 'The Shape of Ignorance', in: Lewis, Hywel David (ed.) Contemporary British Philosophy Personal Statements Fourth Series (1971)
'Objectivity and Objects', Proceedings of the Aristotelian Society, vol. 72 (1971-2), pp. 65–81.
Conflict and the Scope of Reason, the St. John's College, Cambridge, lecture, 1973-74, delivered at the University of Hull, 8 March 1973, (1974)
 'Essay on Man', in R.S. Peters (ed.), Nature and Conduct, Royal Institute of Philosophy Lectures, vol. 8 (1975), pp. 1–13.
 Thought, Word and Deed', Proceedings of the Aristotelian Society, suppl. vol. 54 (1980), pp. 105–17.
 'Discipline and Discipleship', in Ilham Dilman (ed.), Philosophy and Life: Essays on John Wisdom (The Hague, 1984), pp. 201–17.
 'Articulation and Justification', The Monist, vol. 71 (July 1988), pp. 311–19.
 'Ethics and the Limits of Consistency', Proceedings of the Aristotelian Society, vol. 90 (1989–90), pp. 1–15.

For a more complete listing of publications see PhilPapers

References

External links 
 "The Roots of Reason" Jeffrey Scheuer on the philosophical legacy of J. Renford Bambrough for Philosophy Now (2009)
"John Renford Bambrough, 1926-1999" obituary by Jane Heal for The Eagle
"Wittgenstein and the problem of universals" (video) - Bambrough and Stephan Körner discuss 'the traditional problem of universals and Wittgenstein's contribution, in his later philosophy, towards solving the problem'. (Open University, 1972)

1926 births
1999 deaths
20th-century British philosophers
People from Sunderland
Fellows of St John's College, Cambridge
Presidents of the Aristotelian Society